The Principal Secretary to the Prime Minister of India (PS to the PM) is the senior-most bureaucrat in, and the administrative head of, the Prime Minister's Office. The officeholder is generally a civil servant, commonly from the Indian Administrative Service and occasionally from the Indian Foreign Service. The post is considered one of the most influential in the Indian civil services, and some principal secretaries are considered more powerful and influential than senior government ministers.

The status of the principal secretary—akin to the additional principal secretary—was generally considered equivalent to the Cabinet Secretary, the Government of India's topmost civil servant. However, since 2019, the officeholder has been the accorded the status of a cabinet minister.

History 
The Prime Minister's Secretariat (PMS)—headed by an officer of the rank of joint secretary to the Government of India—was established after independence under the prime ministership of Jawaharlal Nehru, as a successor to the office of the Governor-General of India's secretary. Lal Bahadur Shastri appointed Lakshmi Kant Jha, an Indian Civil Service officer, as his secretary, making Jha the first secretary to the Government of India-ranked officer in the PMS. During Indira Gandhi's tenure as prime minister, the post of Principal Secretary to the Prime Minister was created; with retired Indian Foreign Service officer P. N. Haksar becoming the first PS to the PM.

Powers 
The Principal Secretary to the Prime Minister of India acts as the administrative chief of the Prime Minister's Office, and as a result, wields a significant amount of power over the daily affairs of the Government of India. The main functions of the officeholder often include, but are not limited to:

 Advising the prime minister on domestic and foreign policy matters.
 Overseeing the affairs of ministries and departments assigned by the prime minister.
 Coordinating activities in the Prime Minister's Office.
 Dealing with official, governmental, important paperwork in the Prime Minister's Office.
 Preparing notes on issues to be discussed by the prime minister with senior politicians, bureaucrats, and other dignitaries.
 Placing before the prime minister critical files of importance for approval and instructions.

The Principal Secretary to the Prime Minister is generally considered the latter's most crucial aide. Some principal secretaries are considered more powerful and influential than senior government ministers.

Office holders 
List of office holders of the Principal Secretary to the Prime Minister.

Additional principal secretary 
A prime minister—through the Appointments Committee of the Cabinet—can also appoint an additional principal secretary. The only instance of an additional principal secretary being appointed was in May 2014, Pramod Kumar Misra, a retired 1972-batch Gujarat cadre Indian Administrative Service (IAS) officer, was appointed by the Appointments Committee of the Cabinet to serve as newly-elected Prime Minister Narendra Modi's additional principal secretary.

Notes

References

Bibliography

Books

Paper